Msembe Airstrip  is an airstrip serving Ruaha National Park in the Iringa Region of Tanzania. A few domestic airlines fly there, including Coastal Aviation and Auric Air.

See also

List of airports in Tanzania
Transport in Tanzania

References

External links
OurAirports - Msembe
OpenStreetMap

Airstrips in Tanzania
Buildings and structures in the Iringa Region